Trevor Kronemann and David Macpherson were the defending champions but lost in the semifinals to Patrick Galbraith and Rick Leach.

Galbraith and Leach won in the final 5–7, 7–5, 7–5 against Richey Reneberg and Brett Steven.

Seeds

Draw

External links
 Doubles draw

Tennis Channel Open
1996 ATP Tour
1996 Tennis Channel Open